The Wŏnsanhang Line, or Wŏnsan Port Line, is a non-electrified freight-only secondary railway line of the Korean State Railway in Wonsan Municipal City, North Korea, running from Kalma to Wŏnsan Port.

Route 

A yellow background in the "Distance" box indicates that section of the line is not electrified.

References

Railway lines in North Korea
Standard gauge railways in North Korea